Chángquán refers to a family of external (as opposed to internal) martial arts (kung fu) styles from northern China.

The forms of the Long Fist style emphasize fully extended kicks and striking techniques, and by appearance would be considered a long-range fighting system. In some Long Fist styles the motto is that "the best defense is a strong offense," in which case the practitioner launches a preemptive attack so aggressive that the opponent doesn't have the opportunity to attack. Others emphasize defense over offense, noting that nearly all techniques in Long Fist forms are counters to attacks. Long Fist uses large, extended, circular movements to improve overall body mobility in the muscles, tendons, and joints.  Advanced Long Fist techniques include qin na joint-locking techniques and shuai jiao throws and takedowns.

The Long Fist style is considered to contain a good balance of hand and foot techniques, but in particular it is renowned for its impressive acrobatic kicks. In demonstration events, Long Fist techniques are most popular and memorable for their whirling, running, leaping, and acrobatics. Contemporary changquan moves are difficult to perform, requiring great flexibility and athleticism comparable to that of gymnastics.

Long Fist's arsenal of kicks covers everything from a basic front snap-kick to a jumping back-kick, from a low sweep to a whirlwind-kick. Specifically, typical difficulty movements in modern Changquan include: xuanfengjiao (旋风脚; "whirlwind kick"), xuanzi (旋子; "butterfly jump"), cekongfan (侧空翻; "side somersault"), and tengkongfeijiao (腾空飞脚; "flying jump kick").

History of Long Fist
The core of Changquan/Long Fist was developed in the 10th century by Zhao Kuangyin, founding Emperor of the Song Dynasty (960–1279). His style was called Tàizǔ Chángquán, which means "the Long Fist style of Emperor Taizu." These texts can only be reliably dated to the second half of the 19th century. The Long Fist of contemporary wǔshù draws on Chāquán, "flower fist" Huāquán, Pào Chuí, and "red fist" (Hóngquán).

Widely perceived to have a strong Shaolin influence, traditional Long Fist was promoted at the Nanjing Guoshu Institute by Han Qing-Tang (韓慶堂), a famous Long Fist and qin na expert. After the defeat of Chiang Kai-shek and subsequent closing of the institute, the new People's Republic of China created contemporary wushu, a popular artistic sport inspired largely by traditional Long Fist. However, this new evolution of changquan differed from the old style in that it was exhibition-focused. Higher, more elaborate jump kicks and lower stances were adopted, in order to create more aesthetically pleasing forms. Applications were then reserved for the sport of sanshou, which was kept somewhat separate from the taolu (forms). In 2005 with the creation of difficulty movements criteria in international competition, there has been a continued attention to jumps.

Subtypes of Long Fist
 Pào Chuí (Chinese: 炮捶; literally "cannon punch") pre-Tang Dynasty;
 Chāquán (Chinese: 查拳; Cha Yuanyi style) Tang Dynasty (618–907);
 Tàizǔ Chángquán (Chinese: 太祖長拳; "Emperor Taizu (Great Ancestor) long fist") Song Dynasty (960–1279);
 Fānziquán (Chinese: 翻子拳; "tumbling fist") Song Dynasty (960–1279);
 Hóngquán (Chinese: 紅拳; "red fist") Song Dynasty (960–1279); and
 Huáquán (Chinese: 華拳; "China fist") Tang Dynasty (618–907).

A sample Long Fist curriculum from  Han Chin Tang Lineage 
Northern Shaolin Long Fist Kung Fu Includes:
Barehand Forms
Weapons
Qin Na Dui Da (Joint Locking skills & sets)
Two Man Fighting Routines
Self Defense Applications
Iron Palm Training (Internal)

Hand forms
Lian Bu Quan (連步拳) - Consecutive Linking Step Fist
Gong Li Quan (功力拳) or Power Fist Form
Tan Tui (潭腿) or Springing Legs
Yi Lu Mai Fu (一路埋伏) or First Road of Ambush
Er Lu Mai Fu (二路埋伏) or Second Road of Ambush
Shi Zi Tang (十字趟) or Crossing Sequence
Xiao Hu Yan (小 虎 燕) or Little Tiger Swallow
San Lu Pao (三路跑) or Three Ways of Running
Taizu Chuangquan
Si Lu Cha Quan (四路查拳) or Fourth Way of Cha's Fist
Si Lu Ben Za (四路奔砸 ) or Four Way of Running and Smashing

20 Methods Fighting Form or Er Shi Fa Quan (二十法拳)
Duan Da Quan - Fighting In Close Quarters Boxing/Short Hit Boxing
Hua Quan - First Set Of China Fist Yi Lu Xi Yue
Hua Quan 2 - Second Set Of China Fist Er Lu Xi Yue
Hua Quan 3 - Third Set Of China Fist San Lu Xi Yue
Hua Quan 4 - Fourth Set Of China Fist Si Lu Xi Yue
Hua Quan 2 2 Man - Second Set Of China Fist Two Man Fighting Set Er Lu Xi Yue
Hua Quan 4 2 Man - Fourth Set Of China Fist Two Man Fighting Set Si Lu Xi Yue

Hand forms explained
Lian Bu Quan (連步拳) - Consecutive Linking Step Fist: the most basic Shaolin Long Fist form containing over 70 applications.
Gong Li Quan (功力拳) or Power Fist Form: the second basic form using dynamic tension at the end of each technique which develops muscles and tendons. Contains over 70 applications.
Tan Tui (潭腿) or Springing Legs: due to their fast and accurate spring-like kicks, and they have a long history in China. The routines were popularly practiced by Northern Chinese martial arts society between 1736 and 1912. Improve your fighting skills, balance, strength, and focus with Tan Tui. These 12 routines form the basis for other, more complex forms practiced in Northern Shaolin Kung Fu.
Yi Lu Mai Fu (一路埋伏) and Er Lu Mai Fu (二路埋伏), the first and second Ways of Ambush, are powerful fundamental sequences that instruct clever and subtle methods of defense and attack. Both contain practical and effective escape and withdrawal techniques. They are intermediate forms that are considered the "foundation" of Long Fist. Contains subtle techniques designed to trick opponents.
Shi Zi Tang (十字趟) builds on earlier sequences with the addition of several different kicks, side door attacks, and forceful techniques.
Xiao Hu Yan (小 虎 燕) is a challenging and exciting sequence combining techniques from Long Fist and Northern Praying Mantis. Xiao Hu Yan emphasizes low stances, powerful kicks, leg sweeps, trapping, and striking.
San Lu Pao (三路跑) means "Three Ways of Running." It is the first advanced Long Fist sequence. San Lu Pao focuses on the fluid integration of speed and power through several hand and leg techniques, while also pushing the practitioner's endurance and sense of enemy.
Taizu Chuangquan was created by Emperor Taizu in the Song Dynasty (960–976 A.D.). It is an advanced sequence that enhances and develops a student's knowledge in Long Fist fighting techniques while specifically training a combination of rooting, balance, and power.
Si Lu Cha Quan (四路查拳) means "Fourth Way of Cha's Fist." It is one of the more well-known Chaquan sequences in Long Fist. When practiced with a proper sense of enemy, root, speed, and power, it is a very effective style for training higher level techniques in long range fighting.
Si Lu Ben Za (四路奔砸 ) means "Four Way of Running and Smashing." It is considered one of the most difficult and most advanced sequences created in Long Fist. Training this sequence patiently and diligently will lead a student to the highest level of Long Fist techniques.

Stances used in the system
Ma Bu (馬步) (Horse Stance)
Deng Shan Bu (登山步)/Gong Jian Bu (Mountain Climbing Stance/Bow and Arrow Stance)
Jin Ji Du Li (金雞獨立) (Golden Rooster Standing on One Leg Stance)
Xuan Ji Bu (玄機步) (False/Cat Stance)
Zuo Pan Bu (坐盤步) (Crossed-Leg Stance)
Fu Hu Bu (扶虎步) (Flat Stance)
Si-Liu Bu (四六步) (Four-Six Stance)
Tun Bu (吞步) - similar to False Stance, but with toes up and heel on the ground
Half Horse Stance (Lead foot turned forward)

Weapons training
Long Staff (Gun)
Broadsword (Dao)
Double Edge Sword
Spear (Qiang)
Chain/Nine Section Whip (Bian)
Dragon Phoenix Sword
Umbrella
Straight Sword (Jian)
Double Sword (Shuang Jian)
Double Broadsword (Shuang Dao)
Pudao
Meteor Hammer
Hook Sword

Notable practitioners

 Bao Xian Fei
 Alfred Hsing
 Jia Rui
 Zahra Kiani
 Jet Li
 Li Yi
 Edgar Xavier Marvelo
 Vincent Ng
 Daria Tarasova
 Dennis To
 Dương Thúy Vi
 Jade Xu
 Đàm Thanh Xuân
 Yuan Xiaochao
 Yuan Wenqing
 Zhao Qingjian
 Hao Zhihua
 Chris Yen
 Laurent Buson
 Yoon Byung-in
Donnie Yen
 Mark Musashi

Popular Culture
 Changquan's fierce attacks are used as partial inspiration for  firebending in the Nickelodeon animated show Avatar: The Last Airbender and its sequel series The Legend of Korra.

See also
 Chinese martial arts
 Northern Shaolin (martial art)
 Wushu

References

Further reading
Fundamentals of High Performance Wushu: Taolu Jumps and Spins by Raymond Wu, . Training book on classic long fist moves. Fake advertisement offer here.
Shaolin Long Fist Kung Fu by Yang Jwing-Ming, . Training book on Long Fist history, applications, and sequences.
 Shaolin Long Fist

External links
New Life Kung Fu In Spartanburg SC
Linda's Kung Fu In Brick NJ
Kungfu Dragon USA

Chinese martial arts
Chinese swordsmanship
Events in wushu